Barry Ward is an Irish Fine Gael politician who has served as a Senator for the Industrial and Commercial Panel since April 2020.

Early life and education
Ward is originally from Deansgrange and is a qualified barrister. He is a graduate of University College Dublin, serving as auditor of the Literary and Historical Society from 1998 to 1999 and the Young Progressive Democrats in the same academic year.

Political career
Ward worked as a legal advisor to Enda Kenny, prior to seeking public office.

He was elected as a member of Dún Laoghaire–Rathdown County Council at the 2009 local elections. In 2011, he stood unsuccessfully at the Seanad election for the Administrative Panel. In 2012, he received over €10,000 from the council to finance an M.A. in economic policy from Trinity College Dublin. In 2016, Ward organised a John A. Costello commemoration in Deans Grange Cemetery. In 2020, he came to media attention when he proposed a ban on single-use plastics in takeaways in Dún Laoghaire–Rathdown. He also promoted the proposed Sutton-to-Sandycove greenway.

Ward stood unsuccessfully in Dún Laoghaire at the 2020 general election; he won 9.2% of first preference votes and finished seventh.

Ward was elected at the 2020 Seanad election as a Senator for the Industrial and Commercial Panel. Maurice Dockrell was co-opted to Ward's seat on Dún Laoghaire–Rathdown County Council following his election to the Seanad.

Personal life
Ward lives in Deansgrange.

References

External links

Barry Ward's page on the Fine Gael website

Year of birth missing (living people)
Place of birth missing (living people)
Living people
Fine Gael senators
Local councillors in Dún Laoghaire–Rathdown
Politicians from County Dublin
Members of the 26th Seanad
Irish barristers
Auditors of the Literary and Historical Society (University College Dublin)
Alumni of University College Dublin
Alumni of Trinity College Dublin
Alumni of King's Inns
University of Paris alumni